Stella Hagelstam (born 28 February 1984 in Sipoo, Finland) is a Finnish dressage rider. Representing Finland, she competed at the 2014 World Equestrian Games and 2013 European Dressage Championships.

Her best championship result is 10th place in team dressage and 45th place in individual dressage from the 2013 European Championships.

References

Living people
1984 births
Finnish female equestrians
Finnish dressage riders